Interstate 496 (I-496) is an auxiliary Interstate Highway that passes through downtown Lansing in the US state of Michigan. Also a component of the State Trunkline Highway System, the freeway connects I-96 to the downtown area. It has been named the R.E. Olds Freeway (sometimes just Olds Freeway) for Ransom E. Olds, the founder of Oldsmobile and the REO Motor Car Company. I-496 runs east–west from I-96/I-69 near the downtown area and north–south along a section that runs concurrently with US Highway 127 (US 127). The trunkline also passes a former assembly plant used by Oldsmobile and runs along or crosses parts of the Grand and Red Cedar rivers.

Construction of I-496 started in 1963, and the freeway opened on December 18, 1970. Segments of the freeway south of downtown Lansing were built in the location of a historically black neighborhood. This neighborhood was formed based on the segregationist practices of the early 20th century. Community leaders worked for different housing opportunities for the black residents displaced by I-496 rather than fight the freeway. As the trunkline neared completion, competing proposals to name it resulted in two similar, but separate designations applied to I-496. The city originally approved one name in honor of a former mayor. The local historical society proposed that the state name it as a memorial to Olds after the demolition of the Olds Mansion. The city renamed it the Oldsmobile Expressway, the name under which it opened in December 1970. Two years later, the Michigan Legislature restored its preferred name and it has been the Olds Freeway since.

Route description
I-496 starts at an interchange with I-96/I-69 at that freeway's exit 95 in Delta Township in Eaton County. The freeway runs eastward through suburban areas of the township adjacent to some residential subdivisions. Continuing eastward, there is an interchange for Creyts Road before I-496 angles to the northeast. At the interchange with Waverly Road, I-496 crosses into Ingham County. The freeway then runs parallel to the Grand River. Near a partial interchange with Lansing Road (old US 27), the freeway gains a pair of service drives: St. Joseph Street runs one-way westbound on the north side, and Malcolm X Street runs eastbound to the south. The next interchange is for the connection to the Capitol Loop and M-99, both of which run along Martin Luther King Jr. Boulevard. The Capitol Loop, also internally numbered Connector 496, is a signed connector that provides access to various state government buildings like the Michigan State Capitol. South of this interchange, M-99 connects to the Lansing Car Assembly plant, a former facility for Oldsmobile.

Continuing eastward, I-496 passes north of the assembly plant complex and south of the central business district. East of a partial interchange with Walnut Street, the freeway passes the Michigan Women's Hall of Fame, which is located on I-496's southern service drive. The south side of the freeway is adjacent to Cooley Gardens near the confluence of the Grand and Red Cedar rivers. I-496 crosses the Grand River downstream from the confluence and meets the eastern terminus of the Capitol Loop. This interchange with Cedar and Larch streets is also a connection to Business Loop I-96 (BL I-96) and Pennsylvania Avenue. St. Joseph Street ends after the connection to Pennsylvania Avenue. The main freeway crosses a rail line owned by CSX Transportation. I-496 runs parallel to the north side of the rail line while Malcolm X Street follows to the south as far as the Clemens Avenue overpass. The freeway then crosses into East Lansing near the Red Cedar Natural Area.

After crossing the city line, I-496 turns southward and merges with US 127. The two highways run concurrently, and they cross a line of the Canadian National Railway. The freeway runs along the western edge of the campus of Michigan State University. South of campus, I-496/US 127 crosses back into Lansing and has an interchange with Jolly Road before entering Delhi Township. About two-thirds of a mile (1.1 km) south of Jolly Road, I-496 meets I-96 and terminates; US 127 continues southward as a freeway toward Jackson.

Like other state highways in Michigan, I-496 is maintained by the Michigan Department of Transportation (MDOT). In 2011, the department's traffic surveys showed that on average, 61,082 vehicles used the freeway between BL I-96 and the Trowbridge Road interchange south of US 127, the highest traffic count along I-496. West of Creyts Road, 17,600 vehicles did so each day, which was the lowest count along the trunkline. As an Interstate Highway, all of I-496 is listed on the National Highway System, a network of roads deemed important to the country's economy, defense, and mobility.

History

An east–west freeway was originally planned as an Interstate Highway allowing traffic to access downtown Lansing in the 1955 General Location of National System of Interstate Highways (Yellow Book), an early proposal for what would become the Interstate Highway System. As originally proposed by the Michigan State Highway Department in 1958, the freeway was to be called I-296. The department was waiting on approval of a final numbering scheme the next year, before the first Interstates were signed in the state in 1959. By the time construction started on the Lansing freeway, it was numbered I-496.

The section near downtown was to be built through a historically African-American neighborhood. The neighborhood was formed through "unwritten rules of segregation" as real estate agents and mortgage brokers guided black residents to the area when they were looking to buy homes. When the state and federal governments were planning the freeway, the area was chosen for the path of I-496. The neighborhood boasted a community center and several businesses that catered to the black population of Lansing, including the only record store that sold rhythm and blues music. Community leaders did not fight the freeway and instead lobbied for affordable housing and relocation assistance. The construction spurred integration of blacks into the wider community; some were able to move into neighborhoods previously closed to them, purchasing "newer houses near better schools." In total, the construction of the freeway required the demolition or removal of nearly 600 homes, 60 businesses, and 15 farms.

The first section of I-496 was opened in December 1963, and ran from I-96 northerly to M-43/M-78 (Saginaw and Kalamazoo streets) between Lansing and East Lansing. The freeway, comprising the southern two-thirds, was designated I-496/M-78/BL I-96 while the northern portion was on city streets as M-78/BL I-96. Some 50 men completed the work by year's end; they went entirely without vacation time to accomplish the feat. Another section of freeway was opened in 1966, and US 127 was rerouted to follow I-496/M-78. BL I-96 was removed from I-496/US 127/M-78 and routed along the former US 127. The freeway segment north of the Trowbridge Road interchange continuing northward as part of US 127 was opened in 1969. Another section opened at the same time was the western section from I-96 to Lansing Road (then US 27) in 1969. The remaining section between M-99 (then Logan Street, now Martin Luther King Jr. Boulevard) and I-496/US 127 opened on December 18, 1970, completing construction.

The freeway underwent a $42.4 million reconstruction (equivalent to $ in ) between April and November 2001 which included the rehabilitation or reconstruction of 35 bridges,  of freeway, and the addition of a weave-merge lane between Pennsylvania Avenue and US 127.

The name applied to the freeway was not without controversy. The Lansing City Council named it in September 1966 after Ralph W. Crego, a former city council member and the longest-serving mayor in the city's history. The Historical Society of Greater Lansing wanted it named the "R.E. Olds Expressway", in part because the new road brought about the demolition of the Olds Mansion, which was listed on the National Register of Historic Places, and to "recogniz[e] the contributions of R.E. Olds to the industries of the city." The society approached the Michigan Legislature, which introduced House Resolution 48 in February 1970 using the historical society's preferred name. The city council realized that they had been bypassed and conveniently discovered that their original resolution was not "formally adopted". They named a park for Crego instead in October 1970 and adopted a resolution to name I-496 the "Oldsmobile Expressway". The Legislature approved its resolution resulting in two names, one for the founder of the car company, and one for the company itself. The council member who introduced the city's resolution criticized the Legislature for taking action without consultation. The state resolution was intercepted before it could be sent to the Michigan Department of State Highways, and the freeway opened on December 18, 1970, with the "Oldsmobile Expressway" name. On August 21, 1972, during the celebrations for the 75th anniversary of Oldsmobile, Senate Concurrent Resolution 345 renamed I-496 the "R.E. Olds Freeway".

Exit list

Related trunkline

The Capitol Loop is a state trunkline highway running through Lansing that was commissioned on October 13, 1989. It forms a loop route off I-496 through downtown near the Michigan State Capitol complex, home of the state legislature and several state departments. However, unlike other business loops in Michigan, it has unique reassurance markers—the signs that serve as regular reminders of the name and number of the highway. It is known internally at MDOT as Connector 496 for inventory purposes. The highway follows a series of one-way and two-way streets through downtown Lansing, directing traffic downtown to the State Capitol and other government buildings. Unlike the other streets downtown, the seven streets composing the Capitol Loop are under state maintenance and jurisdiction.

The loop was originally proposed in 1986 as part of a downtown revitalization effort. Almost from the beginning before the highway was commissioned in 1989, it was affected by controversial proposals. The first was related to suggestions by community leaders to rename city streets in honor of Martin Luther King Jr. Another controversy dealt with rebuilding the streets as part of a downtown beautification project; the downtown business community protested the original scope of construction, and the Lansing City Council threatened to cancel the project in response to the controversy. In 2010, additional controversies surfaced regarding the posting and enforcement of speed limits on city streets in Michigan, including the streets that make up the Capitol Loop.

See also

References

External links

I-496 at Michigan Highways
I-496 at kurumi.com
I-496 at AA Roads Interstate Guide

96-4
96-4
4
Transportation in Eaton County, Michigan
Transportation in Ingham County, Michigan